Emunah was a monthly Jewish magazine published in Brooklyn, New York. The publisher was Emunah of America, which is a women's Zionist company. It targeted the Orthodox Jewish community, featuring articles of interest to Jewish families, current issues and national news. The last magazine issue published was Spring 2016.

"Emunah" (אמונה) is also a Hebrew word with the meaning 'faith'; however, in Western culture, the concept of faith generally places the action upon the subject rather than its object, as in 'faith in God'. This is passive by nature. In Jewish culture, it is action oriented involving active support, and places the action upon the object, as in 'support God'.

References

External links

Monthly magazines published in the United States
Defunct magazines published in the United States
Jewish magazines published in the United States
Magazines with year of establishment missing
Magazines published in New York City
Magazines disestablished in 2016